On November 8, 2016, the District of Columbia held an election for its non-voting House delegate representing the District of Columbia's at-large congressional district. The election coincided with the elections of other federal, state, and local offices.

The non-voting delegate is elected for a two-year term. Democrat Eleanor Holmes Norton, who has represented the district since 1991, was reelected to a fourteenth term in office.

General election

Candidates
 Martin Moulton (Libertarian), nominee for Shadow Representative in 2014
 Eleanor Holmes Norton (Democratic), incumbent Delegate
 Natale Stracuzzi (D.C. Statehood Green), perennial candidate

Results

See also
 United States House of Representatives elections in the District of Columbia

References

District of Columbia
2016
United States House of Representatives